Children, Youth and Environments is a biannual peer-reviewed academic journal that publishes research articles, in-depth analyses, field reports, and book reviews on research, policy, and practice concerning inclusive and sustainable environments for children and youth worldwide.

From 1984 through 1995, it was produced in print through the Children, Environments Research Group at the City University of New York with Roger Hart as editor-in-chief. Since 2016, it has been published online by the University of Cincinnati.

Abstracting and indexing 
The journal is abstracted and indexed in:
 Community Services Abstracts
Education Facilities Clearinghouse
 Journal of Planning Literature
 Sage Family Studies Abstracts
 Sage Urban Studies Abstracts
 Sociological Abstracts

References

External links
 

Urban planning
Developmental psychology journals
Sociology journals
Biannual journals
Publications established in 1984
English-language journals
Environmental social science journals
Environmental psychology
University of Cincinnati